Lee Byung-hun , known mononymously as Byung Hun, is a South Korean actor and singer. He debuted as a member of the South Korean boy band Teen Top in 2010 under the stage name L.Joe and left in 2017 until he nullified his contract with TOP Media.

Early life and education
Born in Gunsan, North Jeolla Province, South Korea on November 23, 1993. Byung Hun's legal name is 'Lee Byung Hun' and should not be confused with the South Korean actor Lee Byung-hun, both share the exact spelling in Hangul and Hanja as stated by Byung Hun on an episode of MBC Every1's 'Video Star'.

At the age of 12, he immigrated to Oregon, USA for five years before returning to South Korea. While living in the United States, people around him give him the nickname "Joe." Per his stage name, L.Joe, as a member of Teen Top, was the combination of his surname 'Lee' and nickname 'Joe.'

Career

2010–2017: Teen Top and controversy
Byung Hun debuted with his fellow band group Teen Top under TOP Media on July 10, 2010, with their debut song titled “Clap” (박수).

In February 2017, Byung Hun filed for nullification of the contract with T.O.P Media and left TEEN TOP. The reason as to why he wanted to nullify his exclusive contract with TOP Media is still unknown. Issues first surfaced when Byung Hun met T.O.P Media to renew his contract in October 2016. In June 2017, Byung Hun promoted with Teen Top for the last time as L.Joe. His contract with Teen Top did not expire until January 10, 2018.

2017–present: Solo activities 
On May 29, 2018, it was confirmed that Byung Hun will be appearing in Let's Eat 3. The Let's Eat series first aired in 2013 and again in 2015, which gained wide popularity for its realistic portrayal of people who live alone and their eating habits.

In November 2022, Byung Hun signed a contract with SidusHQ.

Filmography

Films

Drama Series

References

External links
 instagram

1993 births
Living people
People from Gunsan
South Korean male singers
South Korean male television actors
South Korean male idols